Curtis Allan Hasler (born December 29, 1964) is an American professional baseball coach and former pitcher. He has served as the bullpen coach for the Chicago White Sox of Major League Baseball since .

Career
Hasler is a native of Honolulu who has spent his entire professional career in the White Sox organization. A ,  right-handed pitcher, he attended Bradley University, and played collegiate summer baseball for the Hyannis Mets in 1985. Hasler was selected by the White Sox in the 21st round of the 1987 Major League Baseball Draft. He pitched for five seasons (1987–91) in the club's farm system, posting a win–loss record of 34–30 and an earned run average of 3.51 in 97 minor-league games and 561 innings pitched. He appeared in 11 games at the Triple-A level in his final active season.

In 1992, he became a pitching coach at the Rookie and Class A levels in the White Sox' system, and continued in that role until he became roving minor league pitching coordinator from 2011 to 2016.  The 2017 season marked his 30th year in the Chicago organization and his first in the Major Leagues as bullpen coach on the staff of Rick Renteria.

References

External links

1964 births
Living people
American expatriate baseball players in Canada
Baseball coaches from Hawaii
Baseball players from Honolulu
Birmingham Barons players
Bradley Braves baseball players
Bradley University alumni
Chicago White Sox coaches
Gulf Coast White Sox players
Hyannis Harbor Hawks players
Major League Baseball bullpen coaches
Minor league baseball coaches
Sarasota White Sox players
South Bend White Sox players
Sportspeople from Honolulu
Vancouver Canadians players